Eric J. Ingham (third ¼ 1944 – 20 April 2017) was an English professional rugby league footballer who played in the 1970s.

Background
Eric Ingham's birth was registered in Leeds district, West Riding of Yorkshire, England, he worked as a plumber, he retired from playing in 1977 to concentrate on his plumbing business, he died aged 72 in Tingley, Leeds, West Yorkshire, England, his funeral service took place at Cottingley Crematorium, Cottingley, Leeds at 11:00am on Thursday 4 May 2017, followed by a reception at The Hare & Hounds, 7 Batley Road, West Ardsley.

Playing career

Club career 
Eric Ingham made his début for Wakefield Trinity playing as an interchange/substitute in the 18-6 victory over Swinton in the 1972 BBC2 Floodlit Trophy during the 1972–73 season at Station Road, Swinton on Wednesday 25 October 1972, he made his starting début (with Tony Handforth injured, regular  Mick Morgan was moved to ) in the 48-10 victory over Hunslet at Parkside, Hunslet on Sunday 14 January 1973, he scored his first try for Wakefield Trinity in the 33-6 victory over Widnes in the first-round of the Play-offs during the 1972–73 season, he scored his last try for Wakefield Trinity in the 16-6 victory over Wigan at Belle Vue, Wakefield on Sunday 21 November 1976, and he played his last match for Wakefield Trinity in the 0-52 defeat by the Featherstone Rovers on Sunday 2 January 1977.

Genealogical information
Eric Ingham is survived by his partner, Heather. Eric Ingham's marriage to Joan M. (née Druggitt) was registered during first ¼ 1973 in Lower Agbrigg district. They had children; Mark Andrew Ingham (birth registered during fourth ¼  in Wakefield district), and Joanna Magaret Ingham (birth registered during first ¼  in Wakefield district), he also had six grandchildren.

References

External links
Search for "Ingham" at rugbyleagueproject.org
Obituary - Eric Ingham
Eric Ingham : Obituary

1944 births
2017 deaths
English rugby league players
Rugby league players from Leeds
Rugby league hookers
Wakefield Trinity players